This Summary and map of the 2005 French riots is to clearly show the spread of the 2005 French riots.

Table

Geographical

Areas affected in Île-de-France 

Paris (3rd arrondissement)
Seine-Saint-Denis: Aubervilliers, Épinay-sur-Seine, Pierrefitte-sur-Seine
Yvelines: Achères, Les Mureaux
Seine-et-Marne: Meaux, Torcy
Val-de-Marne: Champigny, Ormesson-sur-Marne
Essonne: Corbeil-Essonnes, Saint-Michel-sur-Orge, Brétigny-sur-Orge
Hauts-de-Seine: Suresnes, Clamart
Val-d'Oise: Villiers-le-Bel

Other French areas affected 

Aisne: Soissons
Alpes-Maritimes: Drap, Nice, Saint-André, Cannes
Bas-Rhin: Strasbourg
Côte d'Or: Dijon
Doubs: Montbéliard
Eure: Évreux
Finistère: Brest, Quimper
Gironde: Bègles, Blanquefort, Bordeaux, Lormont
Haute-Garonne: Toulouse
Haute-Marne: Saint-Dizier
Haute-Normandie: Rouen
Hautes-Pyrénées: Tarbes
Haut-Rhin: Colmar, Illzach, Mulhouse
Ille-et-Vilaine: Saint-Malo, Rennes
Loir-et-Cher: Blois
Loire-Atlantique: Nantes
Loiret: Montargis, Orléans
Mayenne: Laval
Meurthe-et-Moselle: Nancy
Moselle: Metz, Rombas, Thionville
Nord: Dunkerque, Hem, Lille (Lille-Sud neighborhood), Mons-en-Baroeul, Roubaix, Tourcoing, Valenciennes, Wattrelos 
Oise: Beauvais, Méru, Nogent-sur-Oise, Creil
Pas-de-Calais: Calais, Arras
Puy-de-Dôme: Clermont-Ferrand
Pyrénées-Atlantiques: Pau
Rhône : Lyon, Rillieux-la-Pape
Sarthe: Le Mans
Saône-et-Loire: Montceau-les-Mines, Chalon-sur-Saône
Seine Maritime: Le Havre, Rouen
Somme: Amiens
Tarn-et-Garonne: Montauban
Territoire de Belfort: Belfort
Vaucluse: Avignon

Number of arrests and arson cases

Riots and civil disorder in France